A jetliner is an airliner propelled by jet engines.

Jetliner or jet liner may also refer to:
 Avro Canada C102 Jetliner, a particular jet airliner
 Carstedt Jet Liner 600, a conversion of the de Havilland Dove short range airliner to turboprop power
 Jetliner position, a form of physical torment common during China's Cultural Revolution

See also
 Jet Airliner (disambiguation)